Bhramam is a 2021 Indian Malayalam-language black comedy film directed and filmed by Ravi K. Chandran. The film stars Prithviraj Sukumaran, Unni Mukundan, Mamta Mohandas, Raashii Khanna, Shankar and Jagadish. It is a remake of the 2018 Hindi film Andhadhun. The film released on Amazon Prime Video in India and in theatres elsewhere on 7 October 2021. Bharatanatyam dancer, Leela Samson made her Malayalam debut.

Plot 
The story starts with a hunter out on his way to shoot down a boar when the title is shown written with a sound of a freaky car accident.

The scene then shifts to Ray Mathews, an upcoming, blind pianist who lives alone in a rented house. He uses to go to orphanages and church to perform his piano tunes which indeed impress everyone. Uday Kumar, a famous yesteryear celebrity lives with his wife Simi. They have a beautiful time together. However, Uday gets a call regarding an urgent programme of closing a 10 Crore deal in Chennai. Later, Ray happens to meet Anna when her scooter hits him accidentally which make him fall. She and takes him to her diner where her father and herself get impressed with his piano tunes. Anna drops Ray to his home. However after reaching his home it is then seen that he is faking his blindness. He removes his lenses and clearly watches Anna moving on with her scooter.
 
A couple of hours later, Anna again visits Ray's house and both again go to hear diner where he perform his melody Munthiripoovo and this impress Uday who wishes a best to him and their photo been clicked by Anna. That night, Anna drops him home and gives him some money wishing him a best future ahead. After she leave, a boy watches him counting the money and began to suspect if he is not blind. Anna and Ray develop romantic relationship. Uday tells Simi that he need to go to Chennai to close the deal even though it was their wedding anniversary. Ray and Anna spend a night in Ray's house. The next morning, Ray visits Uday's flat as per the request of Uday to perform a melody of his film song but is welcomed by a Simi in absence of Uday. As Ray began playing the piano, to his shock, he saw the dead body of Uday. At the bathroom he finds  Dinesh Prabhakar, Simi's paramour who had a gun with him. He watches the entire scenario of Dinesh and Simi taking Uday's body and stuffing it in a suitcase. However he is forced to feign ignorance and later leaves.
 
Later, Ray rushes to the police station to inform them that he had witnessed a murder. SI Saijo tells Ray to see the superior officer. To his shock, Ray finds that Dinesh is a CI. As Ray and Dinesh leave for Ray's home, he is blocked by his wife Swapna for not coming home for lunch together with her parents. At Ray's home he finds many things to make him suspicious about his blindness. Uday Kumar's murder spread into the social media and news channels leading to the arrival of his heartbroken daughter Prabha, who goes to the police station with Simi where Ray signs a consent about Uday's reason for death. Then funeral procession goes on with Ray's songs and the speeches of Simi and Uday's yesteryear co-star Menaka. Uday's neighbor Irene Dicotta, informs Saijo that she recognized Dinesh and Uday before Ray's arrival on the day of murder. However Saijo tells this to Simi. Ray is on the way to Uday's flat to take part in pooja function. He is stopped by Anna as she is not satisfied with Ray's initial behavior. Later, Simi pushes down Irene from the top of the building, killing her. This is also witnessed by Ray. However he reaches back his home fast and is visited by Simi who gives him a sweet which she added drug. Then she tests his blindness by making him drink the coffee he made as she drops the poison into it in front of him as he knew that he is faking blindness. Ray snatches the gun from her to make her surrender. However he feels unconscious as the drug she gave him made him permanently blind. By the time Anna realizes that Ray was faking his blindness and tells Simi (without knowing her real face) that he was faking his blindness as she thought that they both were spending the time together. This infuriates Anna, breaking her relationship with Ray. Unfortunately at this point everyone learns that Ray faked his blindness.
 
However, Dinesh decided to kill Ray as his words might be a witness against Dinesh and Simi. Ray calls Anna to console her to which she refuse. Dinesh tries to hang Ray but tactically escapes and on the way to catch him Dinesh is hit by an auto. He is taken to a clinic by two organ traffickers Martha and Lopez where Dr Swamy, also an organ trafficker decides to take his kidneys, but he offers them 1 crore to which they change their mind and help him. Ray goes to Uday's house where Prabha tells him that Simi is out for work. He calls Simi and threatens her to follow his path as she fears him a lot as a witness. He demands 15 lakhs from her for his expenses for ticket to London and for his eye surgery. Simi informs about his threat to Dinesh they both drives to a final destination to kill Ray. On the way Simi is chloroformed by Martha and she taken to Swamy's custody. Ray calls Swapna and tells that Simi had an affair with Dinesh and sends the photo of them together. This angers Swapna and she loses faith in him but later cools down. After watching a news regarding the disappearance of Ray and Simi, Anna suspects if they eloped somewhere else. At Swamy's clinic an impatient Simi exposes the truth about what had happened as her eyes where tied with a cloth. Unknown to her, Martha and Lopez had attached a camera to the wall thereby recording whatever she said in a video. Ray and Swamy demand her 1 crore if she is to be released from their hideout.
 
Dinesh is called to building construction site where Lopez, plans takes the cash and flee with Ray and Swamy. But Dinesh reaches at the top and after a long chase, Lopez is shot down by Dinesh as he falls down and eventually dies as the elevator falls on him. Lopez is hospitalized and later dies due to excessive blood loss. Later, Ray and Swamy knocked Simi unconscious and puts her up into the car boot space and both leave to the police station after Swamy says his future plans to Ray after suggesting him to transfer Simi's cornea to Ray's so as to gain sight.
 
Two years later at a gig in London, Anna meets Ray after his music concert. Ray tells her his story. As Ray and Swamy drive on their way, Swamy advice Ray to take his sight back using Simi's cornea. As he gets out to knock out Simi, he gets killed by her. Ray, still thinking that Swamy is driving, tells that he don't want Simi's fake eyes to see the world. Simi tells Ray to get out the car and drives away. Still infuriated, she drives the car at the high speed towards Ray to kill him as he is the last witness against her. It is then we see that the boar hunter we saw first shot the boar but it jumped to the over speeding car and Simi gets into an accident and dies as the car explodes while Ray stood on the road.
 
After hearing the story Anna feels sympathetic for him and tells him he should have accepted Dr. Swamy's offer and to restore his sight. Ray tells that he is enjoying his world of music in the blindness and happy with his life. The film ends as he walks away by knocking a soda can with his stick.

Cast 

Prithviraj Sukumaran as Ray Mathews
Unni Mukundan as CI Dinesh Prabhakar
Mamta Mohandas as Simi Udayakumar
Raashii Khanna as Anna Simon
Shankar as Udayakumar / Uday
Jagadish as Dr. Swamy
Ananya as Swapna Dinesh
 Sminu Sijo as Martha
 Aneesh Gopal as Lopez
 Sudheer Karamana as SI Saijo Babu
 Rajesh Babu as Simon, a diner owner and Anna's father
 Nandhana Varma as Prabha Udayakumar
 Leela Samson as Irene Dicotta
 Major Ravi as City Police Commissioner Ram Raghavan IPS (cameo)
 Sunil Sukhada as Music Store owner (cameo)
 Shine Tom Chacko as a hunter (cameo)
 Menaka as Uday's yesteryear co-star (cameo)

Production 
The success of Sriram Raghavan's Hindi film Andhadhun prompted regional film makers to remake the film in several Indian regional languages. The official announcement of the film being remade in Tamil as Andhagan, in Telugu as Maestro, and in Malayalam as Bhramam happened almost at the same time. AJ International signed actors Prithviraj Sukumaran, Mamta Mohandas, Raashi Khanna, Unni Mukundan and Shankar to do the roles of Ayushmann Khurrana, Tabu, Radhika Apte, Manav Vij and Anil Dhawan's roles respectively for the Malayalam version to be directed by cinematographer Ravi K. Chandran.

Principal photography began on 27 January 2021 with all cast joining the schedule. On 8 February, R. Rahul, an assistant director who was working on the film was found dead at his hotel room in Maradu in Kochi, Kerala. As per news reports, local police suspect suicide as he was found hanging. Principal photography wrapped in early March.

Music 

The music and background scores of the film is arranged by Jakes Bejoy. The song Munthiripoovo from the movie which was sung by Jakes Bejoy and penned by B.K.Harinaraynan was released on 22 September 2021.

Track listing

Release 
The film was released through Amazon Prime Video only in India and in theatres worldwide (except India) on 7 October 2021.

Reception 
Bhramam received mixed reviews from critics.

Vishal Menon of Film Companion wrote, "Apart from the meta touches, the other way the film works for people who’ve seen the original is how it gets a lot of its casting right."

References

External links 
 

Amazon Prime Video original films
Films about blind people in India
Indian black comedy films
Indian crime thriller films
Films scored by Jakes Bejoy
Malayalam remakes of Hindi films
2021 films
2021 thriller films
2021 black comedy films